{{Infobox video game
|title = Missile Command
|image = Missile Command flyer.jpg
|caption = North American arcade flyer
|developer = Atari, Inc.
|publisher = Arcade  Game Boy 
|designer = Dave Theurer
|programmer = Rich AdamDave Theurer
|composer = Rich Adam
|released = ArcadeAtari 2600Atari 8-bitAtari 5200Atari STGame Boy|genre = Shoot 'em up
|modes = Up to 2 players, alternating turns
|platforms = Arcade, Atari 2600, Atari 5200, Atari 8-bit, Atari ST, Game Boy, Lynx
}}Missile Command' is a 1980 shoot 'em up arcade video game developed and published by Atari, Inc. and licensed to Sega for Japanese and European releases. It was designed by Dave Theurer, who also designed Atari's vector graphics game Tempest from the same year. The game was released during the Cold War, and the player uses a trackball to defend six cities from intercontinental ballistic missiles by launching anti-ballistic missiles from three bases.

Atari brought the game to its home systems beginning with the 1981 Atari VCS port by Rob Fulop. Numerous contemporaneous clones and modern remakes followed. Missile Command is built into the Atari XEGS released in 1987, an Atari 8-bit family computer repackaged as a game console.

Plot
The player's six cities are being attacked by an endless hail of ballistic missiles, some of which split like multiple independently targetable reentry vehicles. New weapons are introduced in later levels: smart bombs that can evade a less-than-perfectly targeted missile, and bomber planes and satellites that fly across the screen launching missiles of their own. As a regional commander of three anti-missile batteries, the player must defend six cities in their zone from being destroyed.

Gameplay
The game is played by moving a crosshair across the sky background via a trackball and pressing one of three buttons to launch a counter-missile from the appropriate battery. Counter-missiles explode upon reaching the crosshair, leaving a fireball that persists for several seconds and destroys any enemy missiles that enter it. There are three batteries, each with ten missiles; a missile battery becomes useless when all its missiles are fired, or if the battery is destroyed by enemy fire. The missiles of the central battery fly to their targets at much greater speed; only these missiles can effectively kill a smart bomb at a distance.

The game is staged as a series of levels of increasing difficulty; each level contains a set number of incoming enemy weapons. The weapons attack the six cities, as well as the missile batteries; being struck by an enemy weapon results in the destruction of the city or missile battery. Enemy weapons are only able to destroy three cities during one level. A level ends when all enemy weaponry is destroyed or reaches its target. A player who runs out of missiles no longer has control over the remainder of the level. At the conclusion of a level, the player receives bonus points for any remaining cities (50 points times scoring level, 1 to 6, first 254 levels; 256, levels 255 & 256) or unused missiles (5 points times scoring level, 1 to 6, first 254 levels; 256, levels 255 & 256). Between levels missile batteries are rebuilt and replenished; destroyed cities are rebuilt only at set point levels (usually per 8,000 to 12,000 points).

The game inevitably ends when all six cities are destroyed, unless the player manages to score enough points to earn a bonus city before the end of the level. Like most early arcade games, there is no way to "win" the game; the game keeps going with ever-faster and more prolific incoming missiles. The game, then, is just a contest in seeing how long the player can survive. On conclusion of the game, the screen displays "The End", rather than "Game Over", signifying that "in the end, all is lost. There is no winner". This conclusion is skipped, however, if the player makes the high score list and the game prompts the player to enter their initials.

Bugs
Upon scoring 810,000 (and per 1,000,000 points thereafter), a large number of cities are awarded (176 cities plus the continuing accrual of bonus cities) and it is possible to carry on playing for several hours. At some later stage the speed of missiles increases greatly for a few screens. On the 255th and 256th yellow screens, the scoring increases by 256 times the base value. For good players these two stages can earn over a million points.

Development
When the game was originally designed, the six cities were meant to represent six cities in California: Eureka, San Francisco, San Luis Obispo, Santa Barbara, Los Angeles, and San Diego. Later in development the names of the cities varied depending on the game level being played, but eventually city names were removed completely.

While programming Missile Command, the lead programmer, Dave Theurer, suffered from nightmares of these cities being destroyed by a nuclear blast.Extra Credits: Narrative Mechanics

PortsMissile Command was ported to the Atari 2600 in 1981. The game's instruction manual describes a war between two planets: Zardon (the defending player) and Krytol. The original arcade game contains no reference to these worlds. On level 13, if the player uses all of his or her missiles without scoring any points, at the end of the game the city on the right will turn into "RF" — the initials of the programmer Rob Fulop. This Easter egg is originally documented in Atari Age (Volume 1, issue #2) in a letter to the editor by Joseph Nickischer, and is the second one publicly acknowledged by Atari.Missile Command was released for the Atari 8-bit family in 1981 and an identical version for the Atari 5200 in 1982. The same Atari 8-bit port was later used in the 1987 Atari XEGS as a built-in game that boots up if there isn't a cartridge or keyboard in the console.

ReceptionMissile Command is considered one of the great classic video games from the Golden Age of Arcade Games. The game is also interesting in its manifestation of the Cold War's effects on popular culture, in that the game features an implementation of National Missile Defense and parallels real-life nuclear war.

The game sold nearly 20,000 arcade cabinets. Missile Command was a commercial success for Sega in Japan, where it was among the top-ten highest-grossing arcade video games of 1980.

In 1983, Softline readers named Missile Command for the Atari 8-bit family eighth on the magazine's Top Thirty list of Atari programs by popularity. In a retrospective review, Brett Weiss of Allgame gave the arcade version a perfect score of 5 out of 5, in terms of controls, frenetic gameplay, sound effects, theme, and strategic aiming and firing.

In 1995, Flux magazine ranked the arcade version 24th on their "Top 100 Video Games".

ReviewsGamesLegacy
Re-releasesMissile Command has seen many re-releases in many Atari compilation titles:
 The game is included in Arcade Classics for the Sega Genesis and Game Gear and a similar Master System compilation titled Arcade Smash Hits.
 The game was released for Microsoft Windows 3.x as part of the Microsoft Arcade package in 1993.
 Accolade released a version for the Game Boy in 1995, as part of their Arcade Classics series. It was later re-released in a double-pack with the Game Boy version of Asteroids, which was licensed by Accolade to Nintendo for publishing.
 The game is included in the Midway Games published  Arcade's Greatest Hits: The Atari Collection 1 for the Sega Saturn, Super Nintendo Entertainment System, and the PlayStation.
 It is also included in Atari Arcade Hits 1, Atari Greatest Hits, Atari Anniversary Edition and Atari: 80 Classic Games in One!.
 The game appears as a bonus unlockable minigame in the PlayStation 2 and Xbox versions of Terminator 3: Rise of the Machines, that can be unlocked once it has been played on a hidden computer in one of the levels.
 The game has also been made available for the Xbox and PlayStation 2 (in both arcade and Atari 2600 versions) as part of Atari Anthology in 2004.
 The game is included in Retro Atari Classics and Atari Greatest Hits Volume 1 for the Nintendo DS. The former title also includes a remixed art version.
 Both the arcade and 2600 versions are part of Atari Vault (2016).
 Both the Atari 2600 and Atari 7800 version was released on the Evercade as part of Arcade Collection 1 and 2 in 2020.

Sequels
In late 1980, a two-player sequel Missile Command 2 was field tested but never released, although at least one prototype appeared in an arcade in Santa Clara, California. This game was similar to the original except that each player had their own set of cities and missile batteries and the players could cooperate to save each other's cities from the onslaught. 

In 1992, Atari developed a prototype of an arcade game called Arcade Classics for their 20th anniversary, which included Missile Command 2 and Super Centipede. Despite its name, however, this version was not the unreleased sequel, but an enhanced remake of the first game. 

In 1981, an enhancement kit was made by General Computer Corp. to convert Missile Command into Super Missile Attack. This made the game even harder, and added a UFO to the player's enemies.

In 1982, Atari released a game called Liberator, which was seen by some as being a sequel to Missile Command with the situation essentially reversed; in Liberator, the player is the one attacking planetary bases from orbit.

Updated versions

Enhanced versions of Missile Command were released for the Atari Lynx and Game Boy.

An updated version called Missile Command 3D was released for the Atari Jaguar in 1995. It contains three versions of the game: Classic (a straight port of the arcade game), 3D (graphically upgraded and with a rotating viewpoint), and Virtual. It is the only game that works with the virtual reality helmet from Virtuality.

Hasbro Interactive released a 3D remake of Missile Command for Microsoft Windows and PlayStation in 1999.Missile Command with high-definition graphics was released via Xbox Live Arcade for the Xbox 360 on July 4, 2007.Missile Command was released for the iPhone and iPod Touch for US$5 on September 23, 2008. It includes two gameplay modes ("Ultra" and "Classic").

In March 2020, Atari released a new remake, Missile Command: Recharged, on mobile platforms. On May 27, the remake also made it to Nintendo Switch as well as home computers via Steam, later on released as a launch title on the Atari VCS.

An updated version of the game was announced in 2018 for the Intellivision Amico.

Clones
Contemporary Missile Command clones include Missile Defense (1981) for the Apple II, Stratos (1982) for the TRS-80, Repulsar (1983) for the ZX Spectrum, and Barrage (1983) for the TI-99/4A. Silas Warner programmed the 1980 clone ABM for the Apple II several years before writing Castle Wolfenstein. Similarly, John Field programmed the Missile Command-like game ICBM (1981), then went on to create Axis Assassin, one of the first five games published by Electronic Arts.Atomic Command, a clone of Missile Command, is playable on the Pip-Boy interface in the Fallout 4 video game.

In popular culture
 Missile Command was referenced in the 1980 episode "Call Girl" of the TV sitcom Barney Miller, which features a detective who is hooked on the game.
 In the 1991 film Terminator 2: Judgment Day, John Connor plays the game in an arcade, echoing the film's theme of a future global nuclear war.
 The documentary High Score (2006) follows William Carlton, a Portland, Oregon gamer, on his quest to beat the Missile Command high score record for Marathon settings.
 In the 2010 open world survival horror video game, Deadly Premonition, the game is mentioned by the protagonist Francis York Morgan, while driving.
 In the 2008 episode "Chuck Versus Tom Sawyer" of the NBC show Chuck, a weapons satellite access code is hidden in the (fictitious) kill screen of Missile Command by its programmer, Mr. Morimoto (Clyde Kusatsu).
 In the 1982 film Fast Times at Ridgemont High, Missile Commands "The End" screen is used to help illustrate the film's ending.

Film connection and adaptation
The gameplay of Missile Command, specifically, the contrails left by incoming ICBMs, and the visuals of cities being destroyed by nuclear warheads on a video display screen, strongly resembles the opening nuclear war scenes from the 1977 film, Damnation Alley.

In February 2010, Atari was talking with several studios to turn Missile Command into a movie. 20th Century Fox acquired the rights to bring Missile Command to film the following year. In May 2016, Emmett/Furla/Oasis Films closed a deal to partner with Atari to produce and finance both Centipede and Missile Command.

World records
Two types of world records are monitored for the arcade version of Missile Command: Marathon and Tournament settings. Both settings allow the player to start with six cities. Marathon settings award bonus cities, while in tournament mode bonus cities are not awarded at any point in the game.

Marathon settings
In 1981, Floridian Jody Bowles played a Missile Command'' arcade game for 30 hours at The Filling Station Eatery in Pensacola. Bowles scored 41,399,845 points with one quarter using Marathon settings, besting the previous known record, according to Atari spokesman Mike Fournell. The record was broken when Victor Ali of the United States scored 80,364,995 points in 1982.

Beginning on March 15, 2013, Victor Sandberg of Sweden scored 81,796,035 points live on Twitch after 56 hours of play. On December 27 of the same year, Sandberg started a 71-hour and 41 minute game with a score of 103,809,990—10 points short of getting an additional 176 cities.

Tournament settings
On July 3, 1985, Roy Shildt of Los Angeles set a world record in tournament-set Missile Command, with a score of 1,695,265, as verified by Twin Galaxies. This score, as well it earning his induction into the Video Game Hall of Fame, were published in the 1986 Guinness Book of World Records.

After more than 20 years, on March 9, 2006, UK-based gamer Tony Temple set a new world record of 1,967,830 points, also with Tournament settings as confirmed by Twin Galaxies. Temple's score was published in the 2008 Guinness Book of World Records Gamer's Edition, although Guinness noted that the score was controversial due to Temple playing on game settings that increased cursor speed and was therefore easier than those of Roy Shildt, the previous record holder. Tony Temple increased his world record on two occasions, culminating in a score of 4,472,570 in 2 hours and 57 minutes–verified on September 9, 2010. This is the first verified time that a player passed wave 256 under tournament settings; the game difficulty starts over at wave 1 again.

See also
 Golden age of video arcade games

References

External links

 
 Missile Command at the Arcade History database
 Missile Command software disassembly and analysis

1980 video games
Arcade video games
Atari 2600 games
Atari 5200 games
Atari 8-bit family games
Atari arcade games
Atari Lynx games
Game Boy games
Nintendo games
Video games about nuclear war and weapons
Game Boy Color games
IOS games
PlayStation (console) games
PlayStation Network games
Trackball video games
Windows games
Xbox 360 Live Arcade games
Video games developed in the United States
Cold War video games